For Me, It's You is the fourth studio album by American band Train, released through Columbia Records on January 31, 2006. It was their last album recorded as a five-piece until 2014's Bulletproof Picasso and the only album to feature the second lineup. The album's first single, "Cab", was released to radio in November 2005. The second and third singles, "Give Myself to You" and "Am I Reaching You Now" were released in mid-2006.

The album was met with commercial disappointment. Despite debuting at number 10 on the US Billboard 200, it descended the chart quickly and is their first album not to have received an RIAA certification. It is also the band's only album to not feature a Billboard Hot 100-charting single.

Track listing
All songs written by Train, except "If I Can't Change Your Mind" by Bob Mould.

Bonus tracks

Personnel
Patrick Monahan – vocals
Jimmy Stafford – guitar
Scott Underwood – drums
Brandon Bush – keyboards
Johnny Colt – bass guitar

Additional personnel
Eddie Horst – string arrangements on 1, 3, 10 and 13
Brendan O'Brien – producer, mixer, and "all other instruments"

Charts

References

Train (band) albums
2006 albums
Albums produced by Brendan O'Brien (record producer)
Columbia Records albums